Facing North is the eighth album by Meredith Monk, released in 1992 through ECM New Series.

Track listing

Personnel 
Musicians
Robert Een – pitch pipe, vocals
Meredith Monk – vocals, piano, organ, pitch pipe
Production
Manfred Eicher – production
Jan Erik Kongshaug – engineering
Barbara Wojirsch – design

References 

1992 albums
Albums produced by Manfred Eicher
ECM New Series albums
Meredith Monk albums